Absu or ABSU may refer to:
Absu (band), a black metal musical group
Absu (album), 2009 album by the band Absu
Abzu, Mesopotamian deity also known as Absu
Abia State University in Abia, Nigeria
All Bodo Students' Union, an organization seeking an independent Bodoland in India
Absu, an area in Axiom Verge